Risty may refer to:
 Risty Wilde, a character in the animated television series X-Men Evolution, disguise for Mystique
 Risty, a character in the Queen's Blade game series and anime series